Schmigadoon! is an American  musical comedy television series created by Cinco Paul and Ken Daurio, with all songs written by Paul, who also serves as showrunner. The series airs on Apple TV+ and premiered on July 16, 2021. The series has been renewed for a second season.

Season 1 of Schmigadoon! was a parody of, and satirical homage to, Golden Age musicals of the 1940s and 1950s. The series stars an ensemble cast led by Cecily Strong and Keegan-Michael Key. The first season was directed by Barry Sonnenfeld, while Robert Luketic will direct the second season, with choreography by Christopher Gattelli. Cinco Paul won the Primetime Emmy Award for Outstanding Original Music and Lyrics in 2022 for "Corn Puddin'", a song that was featured in the pilot episode.

In season 2, filmed in 2022, and premiering on April 5, 2023, Josh and Melissa will find themselves in Schmicago, a world yielding a similar satirical homage to 1960s, 1970s and 1980s musicals.

Background
Cinco Paul had the idea for the show over 20 years before the series premiered, that it would be funny if two men, like the backpackers in An American Werewolf In London, stumbled upon a musical, instead of a horror story. According to Paul, the concept only fully came into focus for him when it changed to "a couple who are stuck there until they can find true love". Paul has said that even though Schmigadoon's musical style, characters and satire are largely based on 1940s and 1950s musicals, the sets and costumes reflect 1910s America, like the setting in The Music Man.

Premise
In the first season, two New York doctors, Melissa and Josh, go on a backpacking trip in an attempt to patch up their failing relationship, only to find themselves still arguing. They get lost and soon discover a magical town called Schmigadoon, which is perpetually trapped in a Golden Age-style musical, and soon learn that they cannot leave the town until they find true love. The title and concept parody the 1947 musical Brigadoon.

In season two, Melissa and Josh find their lives monotonous as doctors in New York City; they search for the quaint village of Schmigadoon but arrive, instead, in a world that pays satirical homage to sexy, dark 1960s and 1970s musicals. The title parodies the 1975 musical Chicago.

Cast and characters

Main 
 Keegan-Michael Key as Josh Skinner, an orthopedic surgeon from New York City, and Melissa's boyfriend
 Cecily Strong as Melissa Gimble, an OBGYN from New York City, and Josh's girlfriend
 Fred Armisen as Reverend Howard Layton, long-suffering husband of Mildred and leader of the Methodist church in Schmigadoon (season 1)
 Dove Cameron as 
Betsy McDonough, a waitress, one of Farmer McDonough's seven daughters, inspired by Ado Annie from Oklahoma! (season 1)
Jenny Banks (season 2), a parody of Sally Bowles from Cabaret
 Jaime Camil as
 Doc Jorge Lopez, an attractive but judgmental widowed doctor, set in his ways, inspired by Captain von Trapp from The Sound of Music (season 1)
Sergeant Rivera (season 2)
 Kristin Chenoweth as 
Mildred Layton, the preacher's wife, whose great-great-grandfather founded Schmigadoon, based mainly on Mrs. Shinn from The Music Man (season 1)
Miss Coldwell (season 2), a parody of Mrs. Lovett from Sweeney Todd: The Demon Barber of Fleet Street
 Alan Cumming as
 Mayor Aloysius Menlove, the closeted gay mayor of Schmigadoon (season 1)
Dooley Flint (season 2), a parody of the title character from Sweeney Todd: The Demon Barber of Fleet Street
 Ariana DeBose as 
Emma Tate, Schmigadoon's schoolmarm, based on Marian Paroo from The Music Man (season 1)
Emcee (season 2), a parody of the same character from Cabaret
 Ann Harada as 
Florence Menlove, the mayor's adoring but sexually frustrated wife (season 1)
Madam Frau (season 2), a parody of Fräulein Schneider from Cabaret
 Jane Krakowski as 
Countess Gabriele Von Blerkom, Doc Lopez's fiancée, a rich, elegant woman, based on the Baroness from The Sound of Music (season 1)
Bobbie Flanagan (season 2), a parody of Billy Flynn from Chicago
 Martin Short as Leprechaun, a magical imp based on Og from Finian's Rainbow Short will appear as the same character in the second season.
 Aaron Tveit as 
Danny Bailey, the town's rapscallion, a carnival barker, based on Billy Bigelow from Carousel (season 1)
Topher (season 2), a parody of the hippies from Hair
 Tituss Burgess (season 2), as Narrator a parody of The Leading Player from Pippin
 Patrick Page (season 2) as Octavius Kratt

Co-starring
 Liam Quiring-Nkindi as Carson, a boy with a lisp, who announces scene changes; Emma says that Carson is her kid brother, but it turns out that he is her son. He is based on Winthrop Paroo from The Music Man. (season 1)

Guest

Season 1
 Peppermint as Madam Vina
 Kevin McNulty as Farmer McDonough
 Timothy Webber as Marv
 Bijou Brattston as Tootie McDonough, one of Farmer McDonough's seven daughters
 Kyra Leroux as Carrie, one of Farmer McDonough's seven daughters
 Darcey Johnson as Innkeeper Harvey
 Amitai Marmorstein as Pete, the cheerful Milkman, who is often the subject of offscreen violence, such as from Farmer McDonough's shotgun or a rock attempted to be skipped by the Mayor
 Scott Patey as Larry the Fireman
 Pedro Salvin as Old Doc Lopez, Doc Lopez's father
 Michelle Rios as Mrs. Lopez, Doc Lopez's mother
 Garfield Wilson as Henry the Iceman
 Cassandra Consiglio as Nancy, Freddy's pregnant girlfriend; she is later revealed to be the Laytons' daughter.
 Alex Barima as Freddy, a sailor, Nancy's boyfriend

Episodes

Season 1 (2021)

Season 2

Production
It was announced in January 2020 that Cecily Strong was set to star in and produce the series, with a series order at Apple TV+ close to finalizing. In October, Keegan-Michael Key, Alan Cumming, Fred Armisen, Kristin Chenoweth, Aaron Tveit, Dove Cameron, Ariana DeBose, Jaime Camil, Jane Krakowski and Ann Harada were added to the cast.

Barry Sonnenfeld directed the season and also executive produced. Besides starring, Cecily Strong served as producer, and Ken Daurio served as consulting producer and writer. Andrew Singer also executive produces with Lorne Michaels on behalf of Broadway Video. The musical numbers were choreographed by Christopher Gattelli. In addition to Paul and Daurio, Allison Silverman, Julie Klausner, Kate Gersten and Bowen Yang were writers on the show. The first season was written in the summer of 2019. The season consisted of six episodes, although it was originally planned to be eight episodes. Bo Welch serves as the series' production designer. Filming for season one began in Vancouver on October 13, 2020, and concluded on December 10, taking place during the COVID-19 pandemic.

The series has been renewed for a second season, also consisting of six episodes, with all of the main cast returning, except for Armisen and Quiring-Nkindi; Tituss Burgess and Patrick Page will join the cast. By June 2022 filming of season two had begun, and it was completed in July 2022. The second season writers include Paul, Josh Lieb, Jonathan Tolins, Raina Morris, and Klausner.

Music
Cinco Paul wrote all of the original songs for the series and also serves as showrunner. The underscore was composed by Christopher Willis. Soundtrack albums were released by Milan Records as each episode was released.

Release
A trailer for the series was released on June 25, 2021. The first two episodes aired on Apple TV+ on July 16, followed by one new episode each subsequent Friday until season 1 ended with episode 6 on August 13, 2021.

The first two episodes of the second season are scheduled to premiere on April 5, with episodes continuing to be released weekly until May 5, 2023.

Reception
On review aggregator website Rotten Tomatoes, Schmigadoon! holds an approval rating of 89% based on 79 reviews, with an average rating of 7.4/10. The site's critical consensus reads, "Schmigadoon!s clever inside-theater jokes may not be for everyone, but there's no denying the joy of seeing this talented ensemble sing (and dance!) their hearts out." On Metacritic, which uses a weighted average, the series has a score of 73 out of 100 based on 34 critics, indicating "generally favorable reviews". In The Boston Globe, Matthew Gilbert noted the show's "underlying affection for musical theater [though it] makes ruthless fun of the conventions of show tunes. ... There is plenty of snark afoot. But the songs are also wittily written, and catchy. The choreography is top-notch and well-shot. And the cast members ... have an infectious enthusiasm."

Accolades
Among other accolades, the series was nominated for four Emmy Awards, winning one. The soundtrack to Episode 1 was nominated for the Grammy Award for Best Compilation Soundtrack for Visual Media, and Chenoweth was nominated for a Critics' Choice Television Award for Best Supporting Actress in a Comedy Series. The series, its writers, Key, DeBose and Chenoweth were all nominated for Hollywood Critics Association TV Awards. The series was also nominated for the Saturn Award for Best Streaming Fantasy Television Series.

References

External links
 
 Official pilot screenplay
 "Corn Puddin" scene from Episode 1, season 1, which won an Emmy Award
 Season 2 official trailer

English-language television shows
2020s American musical comedy television series
2021 American television series debuts
Apple TV+ original programming
Primetime Emmy Award-winning television series
Television series by Broadway Video
Television series by Universal Television
Television shows filmed in Vancouver
Television shows set in New York City
Works by Barry Sonnenfeld
Magic realism television series